Balearosaurus is an extinct genus of moradisaurine captorhinid from the Permian of Spain. The type species is B. bombardensis.

References 

Prehistoric reptile genera
Permian species
Permian Europe
Captorhinids
Fossil taxa described in 2021